Hsueh Ling (born in 1954) is a member of the Democratic Progressive Party who is in the Legislative Yuan in Taiwan.

References

Living people
1954 births
Democratic Progressive Party Members of the Legislative Yuan
Members of the 8th Legislative Yuan
Party List Members of the Legislative Yuan
Taiwanese bankers
Women bankers
21st-century Taiwanese women politicians
Members of the 7th Legislative Yuan
Members of the 6th Legislative Yuan
Spouses of Taiwanese politicians